Manoj Singh Tiger, popularly known as Manoj Tiger, is an Indian actor mainly active in Bhojpuri films. He is known for his comedic roles in films and has also worked as main villain in several Bhojpuri films. He has also appeared in the Bollywood films The Accidental Prime Minister and Batla House.

Early life and education
He attend University of Allahabad and attained the degree of Bachelor of Arts.

Career
In 2007, he worked in Nirahua Rickshawala with Dinesh Lal Yadav and Pakkhi Hegde. The popularity of this character has been that two films in the name of Batasha Chacha have also been released.

Filmography

Awards

References

External links
 

Living people
Male actors in Bhojpuri cinema
Male actors from Bihar
Indian male film actors
1976 births